No. 22 Squadron RNZAF was a squadron of the Royal New Zealand Air Force. Formed in August 1942, during World War II, at RNZAF Station Onerahi equipped with the Hawker Hind, co-ordinating with New Zealand Army units providing training for air liaison officers. Reformed on 19 June 1944 at RNZAF Station Ardmore, equipped with Chance-Vought F4U-1 Corsair fighter bombers. The squadron served at airfields in Espiritu Santo, Guadalcanal, Bougainville and Emirau before being disbanded in September 1945.

Commanding officers
Wing Commander J.G. Fraser
Squadron Leader B. H. Thomson
Squadron Leader J. R. Court
Squadron Leader G. A. Delves

Citations

References
Owen, R.E. Official History of New Zealand in the Second World War 1939–45, Government Printer, Wellington, New Zealand 1955

22
Squadrons of the RNZAF in World War II
Military units and formations established in 1942
Military units and formations disestablished in 1945